The Fortress of Arad is a fortification system built in the city of Arad, on the left bank of the Mureș River in the 18th century at the direct order of the Habsburg Empress Maria Theresa. The fortress lies today in the Subcetate neighbourhood of the city, on the former military border between the Habsburg Empire and the Ottoman Empire. The fortress has been used during its existence as a military garrison, a military prison and today it is the home of the Mixed Romanian-Hungarian Battalion since 1999.

Building of the fortress
Following the victories of the Holy League at the Battle of Vienna and the Habsburg victory at the second Battle of Mohács the city of Arad has been freed from Ottoman rule. After the Treaty of Karlowitz, the entire city of Arad was on the border region of the Habsburg Empire and so, of critical importance for the Viennese Court as it became a focal point of the Military Frontier administration until 1751. The strategic placement of the city determined Prince Eugene of Savoy, to rebuild and improve the former rectangular Turkish built fortress, on the right bank of the river, but after consultations with the Empress, the decision was made not to rebuild the old fortress, but to erect a new and vastly improved fortified complex on the peninsula lying just south of the city.

The project was made after the plans of the Austrian general and architect , having the form of a star with six corners, built with three rows of underground pillboxes and several trenches, which in the past could have been flooded. Construction lasted from 1763 to 1783, the building efforts were done with thousands of prisoners and with costs of 3 million florins. The main entrance gate and buildings inside the fortress were built in the Baroque style. Inside the fortress, there is a Catholic church, and in the surrounding church buildings were housed Franciscan friars, under the patronage of St. John of Capistrano. The last four monks lived in the fortress until 1861. Today the church and adjacent buildings are more or less in a derelict state.

History
After its completion, the fortress was a part of the inner system of fortifications that protected the outer regions of the empire, for possible conflicts in the area, as with the Oradea and Timișoara fortifications. Starting in 1794, the fortress was used as a military prison, where 1,200 French soldiers were imprisoned. During the 1848–1849 Hungarian Revolution, the fortress played a key role as it was besieged by the Hungarian Republican army for nine months until it was finally occupied in June 1849. After only 46 days, the Habsburg army moved back into the fortress and used it partly as a military prison for more than 500 officers. Most of the prisoners were sentenced to death. Among them were the 13 Generals of the Republican Army that were executed on October 6, outside the outer east walls of the fortress, and today are considered martyrs. In 1852, Emperor Franz Joseph I visited the fort and ordered some pardons. One of the most important prisoners who was imprisoned in the fortress was the Romanian revolutionary Eftimie Murgu.

During World War I, thousands of Serb soldiers and civilians from Bosnia-Herzegovina were placed in detention here in an improvised camp outside the fort. Out of the entire number of persons imprisoned here, 4,317 died as a result of typhus and maltreatment. They were buried in several mass graves in the Pomenirea Cemetery. A plaque has been placed at the entrance of the fortress in their honor.

The most famous prisoner in the fortress of Arad was undoubtedly Gavrilo Princip, who on 28 June 1914 killed the heir to the throne of Austria-Hungary, Archduke Franz Ferdinand and his wife, Sophie, in Sarajevo, an event which led to the outbreak of World War I. In an interpellation to the Hungarian parliament in Budapest during 1917, Ștefan Cicio Pop, deputy of the Romanian National Party, warned about the inhumane conditions in which prisoners were held in the fortress of Arad. 

After the first World War, the fortress was occupied by allied Serbian and French troops under French command, until July 1919 when it was handed over to the Romanian Army. In the interwar period, the fortress was a garrison of the 93 Infantry Regiment of the 1st Romanian Infantry Division. After the armistice between Romania and the Soviet Union, signed in Moscow on September 12, 1944, the city and the Arad Garrison were occupied by the Soviet Red Army. The city garrison remained a Soviet tank unit until 1958 when the Red Army retreated, leaving way to the Romanian Army.

External links
 Site of Arad Town Hall – Fortress of Arad 
 ProUrbe – Fortress of Arad

Buildings and structures in Arad, Romania
Castles in Romania
Baroque architecture in Romania
Historic monuments in Arad County